The Riddle is a 2007 British psychological crime thriller film directed and written by Brendan Foley. It stars Vinnie Jones, Derek Jacobi, Julie Cox, Vanessa Redgrave, and Jason Flemyng.

Plot
When a woman is murdered following her discovery of an unpublished Charles Dickens manuscript, an unusual trio team up to investigate. The three are Mike (Jones), an ambitious sports tabloid journalist determined to make a name for himself, Kate (Cox), a police officer, and an eccentric old beach-combing tramp (Jacobi). Together they must track down the mystery and we are taken back to the world of Charles Dickens. Only when they solve the riddle of the manuscript are they able to solve the present day crime, but they must also face opposers: a greedy detective (Moriarty), a publisher (Redgrave), and a ruthless construction company owner (Flemyng).

Principal cast 
 Vinnie Jones as Mike Sullivan
 Derek Jacobi as The Tramp / (19th century) Charles Dickens
 Julie Cox as Kate Merril
 Vanessa Redgrave as Roberta Elliot
 Jason Flemyng as Don Roberts
 P. H. Moriarty as D.I. Willis / (19th century) Constable Frederick
 Mel Smith as Professor Cranshaw
 Vera Day as Sadie Miller
 Kenny Lynch as Shotgun Ronnie White 
 Gareth Hunt as Roy McBride

Filming
The film was shot in London's Greenwich, Lewisham, Southwark, and Chislehurst Caves in Bromley district. The opening sequence was shot at the Central Park Stadium in Murston.

Promotion 
The Riddle was released direct-to-video as a world exclusive premiere promotion on 16 September 2007, and came free inside The Mail on Sunday, which bought the UK DVD rights. The promotional DVD contains a trailer for Bog Bodies, a horror film also directed by Brendan Foley.

References

External links 

 
 
 

2007 crime thriller films
2007 independent films
2000s mystery thriller films
2007 psychological thriller films
2007 direct-to-video films
2007 films
British crime thriller films
British detective films
British independent films
British mystery thriller films
British psychological thriller films
Films about murder
Films based on works by Charles Dickens
Films set in London
Films shot in Kent
Films shot in London
Works about Charles Dickens
2007 directorial debut films
2000s English-language films
2000s British films